The 6021/6022 Jilin-Harbin Through Train is a Chinese passenger train service running between Jilin City to Harbin, capital of Heilongjiang express passenger trains by the Shenyang Railway Bureau, Jilin passenger segment responsible for passenger transport task, Jilin originating on the Harbin train. 25B Type Passenger trains running along the Jishu Railway and Labin Railway across Heilongjiang, Jilin and other provinces and cities, the entire 284 km. Jilin Railway Station to Harbin East Railway Station running 6 hours and 37 minutes, use trips for 6021; Harbin East Railway Station to Jilin Railway Station to run 6 hours and 55 minutes, use trips for 6022.

See also 
Jilin-Harbin Through Train

References 

Passenger rail transport in China
Rail transport in Jilin
Rail transport in Heilongjiang